Fort Washington station is a station along the SEPTA Lansdale/Doylestown Line. The station is located at the intersection of Bethlehem Pike and Station Avenue in the Fort Washington section of Whitemarsh Township, Pennsylvania. It is also served by SEPTA Bus Routes 94, 95, and 201, as well as OurBus intercity buses to New York City.  The station includes a 585-space parking lot. Originally built in 1903 by the Reading Company, it was rebuilt with high-level platforms in 2010.  In FY 2017, Fort Washington station had a weekday average of 1,125 boardings and 875 alightings. The first train from the station leaves at 5:32 A.M, while the last train arrives at the station at 1:10 A.M. The station is considered a major station on the Lansdale/Doylestown Line because most of the express trains stop at this station, before skipping many other intermediate stations on the line. Only one train, an express from Center City Philadelphia to North Wales skips this station. During the morning and afternoon peak hour, many trains operate to Center City as expresses, proceeding direct from Fort Washington station to Temple University station. Throughout midday, and the later hours of the night, most trains are locals.

Station layout
Fort Washington has two high-level side platforms.

References

External links

SEPTA – Fort Washington Station
2001 & 2005 Bob Vogel Photos(NYC Subways.org)
Older and more recent Fort Washington Reading RR Station images
 Bethlehem Pike entrance from Google Maps Street View

SEPTA Regional Rail stations
Former Reading Company stations
Railway stations in the United States opened in 1903
1903 establishments in Pennsylvania
Railway stations in Montgomery County, Pennsylvania
Stations on the SEPTA Main Line